Sevgi Sabancı (born 1963), is a Turkish businesswoman, a third-generation member of the Sabancı family. She is the granddaughter of Hacı Ömer Sabancı and the step-sister of Güler Sabancı.

Biography
Sevgi Sabancı was born in 1963 in Adana as the daughter and first child of İhsan Sabancı and his second wife Nevin Tenik (from a religious marriage that remains commonplace in Turkey).

After spending her childhood and youth in Adana, she went to England for her university education and stayed there between 1980-1985. Following graduation from University of Westminster and Richmond, The American International University in London, she returned to her hometown and worked in the Sabancı Holding’s export company Exsa for three years. She then went back to England, and started a textile business, running and successfully exiting in 1995.

In 1995, Sevgi Sabancı started to own and operate a dealership business of Toyota brand in Istanbul. Afterwards, she established a consultation company, and gave management services to companies operating in textiles, real estate and healthcare sectors.

Sevgi Sabancı has a son, Ihsan John (1993), and a daughter, Serra (1995).

External links

1963 births
Living people
Businesspeople from Adana
Sevgi Sabanci
Alumni of the University of Westminster
Turkish women in business
Turkish businesspeople